Nasos Vagenas, also transliterated Vayenas (Greek: Νάσος Βαγενάς; born 8 March 1945, Drama, Greece) is a Greek poet and translator.

Vagenas studied philology at the University of Athens. He has taught at the universities of Athens (1963–1968), Rome (1970–1972), Essex (1972–1973) and Cambridge (1974–1978), where he wrote his doctorate thesis on the poetry of George Seferis.

Works

Poetry
 Πεδίον Αρεως (1974)
 Βιογραφία (1978)
 Τα γόντα της Ρωξάνης (1981)
 Βάρβαρες Ωδές (1992
 Η πτώση του ιπτάμενου β' (1997)
 Σκοτεινές μπαλλάντες και άλλα ποιήματα (2001)

Essays
 Η συντεχία (1976)
 Ο ποιητής και ο χορευτής (1979)
 Ο λαβύρινθος της σιωπής (1982)
 Η Εσθήτα της Θεάς (1988)
 Η ειρωνική γλώσσα (1994)
 Σημειώσεις από το τέλος του αιώνα (1999)

Translations of his poetry

In English
 Βiography, translated by Richard Berengarten. Cambridge: Lobby Press, 1978.
 Biography and Other Poems, translated by John Stathatos. London: Oxus Press, 1979.

In German
 Wanderung eines Nicht-Reisenden, translated by Alexandra Rassidakis. Cologne: Romiosini, 1997.

In Italian
 Vagabondaggi di un non viaggiatore, translated by Caterina Carpinato. Milan: Crocetti, 1997.

In Dutch
 Biografie en andere gedichten, translated by Marko Fondse and Hero Hokwerda. Amsterdam: Het Griekse Eiland, 1990.
 Barbaarse Oden, translated by Marko Fondse and Hero Hokwerda. Groningen: Styx Publications, 1997.

In Romanian
 Rătăcirile unui necălător, translated by Victor Ivanovici. Bucharest: Seara, 1998.
 Ode Barbare, translated by Valeriu Mardare. Bucharest: Omonia, 2001.

In Serbian
 Варварске оде. Песме и есеји, translated by Ivan Gadjanski and Ksenija Maricki Gadjanski. Belgrade: Rad, 2001.

External links
  biography in Theatre of the Society for Macedonian Studies

1945 births
Living people
People from Drama, Greece
20th-century Greek poets
21st-century Greek poets
Greek male poets
Greek translators
20th-century Greek male writers
21st-century Greek male writers